Trent Skaggs (born June 7, 1973) is a businessman and a Democratic member of the Missouri House of Representatives.  He resides in Kansas City, Missouri, with his wife, Amanda Corn, their two daughters, Ella and Cora, and their son, Levi.

He was born in North Kansas City, Missouri, and graduated from North Kansas City High School.  He went on to obtain a B.A. in government with a minor in economics from Northwest Missouri State University, going on to obtain a master's degree in public administration-healthcare from the University of Missouri-Kansas City.  He is currently a partner in Hospital Management Consulting, LLC.

He is a deacon of the First Baptist Church of North Kansas City.  He is also a member of the board of directors of Concerned Care, North Kansas City's Tax Increment Finance Committee, Business Council, and Breakfast Club, Northland Chamber, Young Friends of the Northland (former co-chair), and a member of the Democratic Central Committee.

He was first elected to the Missouri House of Representatives in 2002, winning reelection in 2004.  He currently serves on the Local Government committee as well as the Utilities committee.

References
Official Manual, State of Missouri, 2005-2006. Jefferson City, MO: State of Missouri.

1973 births
Living people
People from North Kansas City, Missouri
Baptists from Missouri
Democratic Party members of the Missouri House of Representatives
Northwest Missouri State University alumni
University of Missouri–Kansas City alumni